Guptsar Sahib is a holy Gurdwara (English: Sikh shrine) located on the outskirts of Chhattiana village of Sri Muktsar Sahib district in Punjab, India.

History 

The tenth Sikh guru, Guru Gobind Singh, visited the place after the Battle of Muktsar in 1705.

Peer Sayyad Ibrahim 

There was a Muslim recluse, Ibrahim, who converted into Sikhism and received the name Ajmer Singh when the tenth master came to this village. The shrine of the Pir/Peer is located at  near the Gurudwara in northwest direction.

References 

Sri Muktsar Sahib district
Gurdwaras in Punjab, India